Mustard may refer to:

Food and plants
 Mustard (condiment), a paste or sauce made from mustard seeds used as a condiment
 Mustard plant, one of several plants, having seeds that are used for the condiment
 Mustard seed, seeds of the mustard plant used in cooking
 Mustard greens (Brassica juncea), edible leaves from a variety of mustard plant
 Mustard oil
 Mustard family, or Brassicaceae, a family of plants
  Mustard Tree, or Salvadora Persica
 Mustard stick, the fresh fruit of the betel vine
 Tomalley, sometimes called the "mustard" of a crab or lobster

Science and technology
 Mustard (color), a shade of yellow, similar to the color of the condiment
 BAC Mustard (Multi-Unit Space Transport and Recovery Device), an experimental British spacecraft 
 Mustard gas or sulfur mustard, a chemical weapon
 Nitrogen mustard, chemotherapy agents derived from mustard gas

Other uses
 Mustard (name), including a list of people with the name
 Mustard (album), by Roy Wood
 Colonel Mustard, a Cluedo character
 Mustard (My Hero Academia), a character in the manga series My Hero Academia

See also
 Mustard plaster, a traditional medical treatment used to treat minor ailments, made from mustard seed powder
 Mustard and cress, a mixture of mustard seeds and garden cress seeds grown as sprouts and used as a sandwich filling or garnish for a salad or other dishes
 The Mustard Seed (disambiguation)
 Mustard tree